Skelbo Castle is a ruined 14th century keep, located near Dornoch, Sutherland, Scotland. The remaining wall is best preserved at the northern side of the castle. The remains are protected as a scheduled monument. The castle is located at a former ferry crossing and commanded views over Loch Fleet.

History
Hugh de Moravia granted Skelbo in 1211 to Gilbert de Moravia the Bishop of Caithness. In 1235, the castle was granted to Richard de Moravia by his brother Gilbert de Moravia, Bishop of Caithness. King Edward I of England's commissioners were awaiting the arrival of Margaret, Maid of Norway at Skelbo Castle, when they learned of her death in Orkney in September 1290, aged 7 years, whilst on her voyage from Norway to Scotland, to assume the Scottish throne.

In 1308, Robert the Bruce captured a castle at the site belonging to the Sutherlands.

In 1494, Marjory Mowat widow of John of Kinnaird disputed ownership of the castle with Thomas of Kinnaird. The court ordered a lawyer to interview the witnesses to a charter.

In 1529, the castle was bought by William Sutherland, 6th of Duffus. A 16th-century house was built adjacent, but the whole site was abandoned as a residence in the 20th century.

 Mikhail de Buar (d.2009) – last owner of the castle, who died without the testament. His legacy is now the subject of a major scandal and litigation  in Russia.

See also
Castles in Scotland

References

External links

Castles in Highland (council area)
Scheduled Ancient Monuments in Highland
Listed castles in Scotland
Ruined castles in Highland (council area)
Buildings and structures in Sutherland